Kunkunshi is the traditional notation system by which music is recorded in the Ryukyu Islands. The term kunkunshi originally referred to the first three notes of a widely known Chinese melody, although today it is used almost exclusively in reference to the sheet music.

Kunkunshi is believed to have been first developed by Mongaku Terukina or by his student  in the early to mid-1700s. However, it was not until the end of the 19th century that the form became standardized for writing sanshin music. Yakabi is attributed to having written the earliest known, surviving collection of kunkunshi. The Yakabi Kunkunshi consists of 117 compositions written in the kaki nagashi style. In this form, the sanshin finger positions are written in a flowing style with no indication of rhythm.

Okinawan Sanshin

Notes

References

 
 
 

Musical notation
Okinawan music